Sacred Heart Girls Higher Secondary School is an educational institution in Thalassery, situated in the heart of Thalassery town, in front of the Thalassery Fort. Sacred Heart Girls High School is run by Apostolic Carmel Corporate management.

History 
Sacred Heart School was established in 1886. The construction of the school in 1886 was an ambitious undertaking of the young parish consisting of 424 families. Under Father Gerald Geary's leadership as pastor, the parishioners gave top priority to the establishment of a parish school. Archbishop John J.Mitty of the Archdiocese of San Francisco approved the building contract in 1956. The Ladies Guild and the Mens Club, along with the strong financial support of the parishioners, raised sufficient money to complete the eight-room building by 5 September 1957, the opening day of school.

Management 
School is run by the Apostolic Carmel Corporate management which is dedicated to girls education. A Board of Management is responsible for the overall management and policy development of the School. The Board is composed of the Headmistress and  parents with skills to contribute to the management of the School. The Management appoints the Head Mistress who is responsible for the employment of staff, after consultation with the Board of Management.

See also 
 List of educational institutions in Thalassery

References

Christian schools in Kerala
High schools and secondary schools in Kerala
Girls' schools in Kerala
Schools in Kannur district
Education in Thalassery
Educational institutions established in 1886
1886 establishments in British India